Blood flow restriction training / Occlusion Training (also abbreviated BFR training) or Occlusion Training or KAATSU is an exercise and rehabilitation modality where resistance exercise, aerobic exercise or physical therapy movements are performed while using an Occlusion Cuff which is applied to the proximal aspect of the muscle on either the arms or legs. In this novel training method developed in Japan by Dr. Yoshiaki Sato in 1966, limb (legs or arms) venous blood flow is restricted via the occlusion cuff throughout the contraction cycle and rest period. This result is partial restriction of arterial inflow to muscle, but, most significantly, it restricts venous outflow from the muscle. Given the light-load and strengthening capacity of BFR training, it can provide an effective clinical rehabilitation stimulus without the high levels of joint stress and cardiovascular risk associated with heavy-load training.

Application
Practitioners include physical therapists, orthopedic surgeons, chiropractors, trainers, coaches and athletes. Users include individuals who are injured and disabled. Occlusion cuffs are of various widths. The use of occlusion cuffs is based on published scientific literature. The current approaches that focus on applying BFR during exercise consist of automatic pneumatic tourniquet systems or handheld inflatable devices. Research demonstrating the influence of thigh circumference and cuff width on occlusion pressure indicates a likely need for an individualised approach to BFR, particularly with regard to the setting of the restriction pressure.

More recently, a technique to calculate and prescribe the occlusive stimulus as a percentage of total limb occlusion pressure is just one example of efforts to account for the above factors and provide an individualised approach to prescribing BFR training. While the relationship between BFR pressure and the underlying tissue compression during exercise is not yet fully understood, BFR training using 40%–80% of limb occlusion pressure is safe and effective when supervised by experienced practitioners; therefore, lower pressures may provide less risk without the need for higher pressure. Professor Sir Yoshiaki Sato, M.D., Ph.D. of Tokyo, Japan invented KAATSU Training or BFR in 1966 in Tokyo, Japan and is the Chief Executive Office of KAATSU Japan Co., Ltd.

Physiology 
Blood flow restriction training combined with low intensity resistance training may be able to provide similar effects on muscle hypertrophy as high intensity resistance training alone. During high intensity resistance training, lactate is released and builds up in the muscles. Lactate build up increases the amount of growth hormone available. Growth hormone stimulates IGF-1, which combines satellite cells with muscle fibers to create new muscle cells. Since the effects of blood flow restriction training have proven to be similar to those of high intensity resistance training alone, blood flow restriction training with low intensity training can potentially induce muscle hypertrophy while placing less stress on injured joints, allowing for continued recovery.

Adaptations 
Historically, exercise loads of approximately 70% of an individual's one repetition maximum (1RM) have been deemed necessary to elicit muscle hypertrophy and strength gains. In recent years, research has demonstrated that augmentation of low-load resistance training with blood flow restriction (LL-BFR) to the active muscles can produce significant hypertrophy and strength gains, using loads as low as 30% 1RM. BFR training has been found to yield hypertrophy responses comparable to that observed with heavy-load resistance training. Recently, it has also been indicated that BFR training induces beneficial changes in tendon structure and tendon stiffness.

Benefits 
BFRT has been shown to improve physical function, and improve pain and stiffness in patients with knee osteoarthritis (OA). When BFRT is used with the quadriceps, it not only increases lower limb muscle mass and strength, but significantly improves the functionality of the knee. BFRT has shown to be a promising adjuvant therapy in dermatomyositis, polymyositis, and inclusion body myositis.

Risks 
When using belts and lifting straps as a tourniquet, the amount of pressure on the vasculature cannot be controlled and there are reports of rhabdomyolysis cases due to VOT (Vascular Occlusion Training). The original inventor of BFR training, Dr. Yoshiaki Sato, experimented between 1966 and 1973 to understand the precise pressure ranges for people of all ages that were safe and effective.  These ranges were later confirmed by cardiologists Toshiaki Nakajima, M.D., Ph.D. and Morita Toshihiro, M.D., Ph.D. at the University of Tokyo Hospital on over 7,000 cardiac rehabilitation subjects between 2004 and 2014.

See also
 Kaatsu

References

Physical exercise
Weight training
Japanese inventions
Exercise-related trademarks
Physical therapy
Sports medicine
Athletic training